These are the Canadian number-one albums of 2009. The chart is compiled by Nielsen Soundscan and published by Jam! Canoe, issued every Sunday. The chart also appears in Billboard magazine as Top Canadian Albums.

Notes
A ^ Number Ones by Michael Jackson is considered a catalog album by Billboard. Therefore, the number one album of that week was The E.N.D by Black Eyed Peas on the Billboard Canadian Albums chart.

See also
List of Hot 100 number-one singles of 2009 (Canada)

References

External links
Top 100 albums in Canada on Jam
Billboard Top Canadian Albums

2009
Canada Albums
2009 in Canadian music